Gareth Melville Davies (born 11 December 1973) is a Welsh former professional footballer who played as a central defender. He made over 100 appearances in the English Football League during his career before being forced to retire after a long-term knee injury.

Although he was born in England, he grew up just across the border in Wales and represented them at Under 21 level.

Personal life
Davies was born in Hereford. His cousin, Kevin Sheedy, was also a professional footballer.

His son, Rhys, is also a professional footballer who currently plays for Aberystwyth Town having previously played for Hereford FC.

Career
Davies joined his local club Hereford United as a YTS trainee at the age of 15, making his debut for the first team in 1992. He was sold to Crystal Palace in 1995 for a £120,000 fee, and was later transferred for £175,000 to Reading. He made one Premier League appearance for Crystal Palace in a game against Leicester City.

He first suffered an injury to his knee while playing for Swindon Town, which severely restricted his appearances for the club. In 2002, after undergoing three operations on his knee, Davies decided to retire from professional football. He later played for non-league side Chippenham Town, before retiring from football altogether in 2003 to work in the recruitment industry.

References

External links

Gareth Davies Interview

1973 births
Living people
Welsh footballers
Wales under-21 international footballers
Hereford United F.C. players
Crystal Palace F.C. players
Cardiff City F.C. players
Reading F.C. players
Swindon Town F.C. players
Chippenham Town F.C. players
Premier League players
English Football League players
Association football defenders